Aljaž Bedene won the title, defeating Josselin Ouanna 6–3, 4–6, 6–3 in the final.

Seeds

Draw

Finals

Top half

Bottom half

References
 Main Draw
 Qualifying Draw

ATP China Challenger International - Singles
2012 Singles